Maireana carnosa, the cottony bluebush, is a species of flowering plant in the family Amaranthaceae, native to western and central Australia. It is typically found growing in heavy soil, often on the verges of salt lakes.

References

carnosa
Endemic flora of Australia
Flora of Western Australia
Flora of South Australia
Flora of Queensland
Plants described in 1975